The 1951–52 season was the 53rd completed season of The Football League.

Final league tables

The tables below are reproduced here in the exact form that they can be found at The Rec.Sport.Soccer Statistics Foundation website and in Rothmans Book of Football League Records 1888–89 to 1978–79, with home and away statistics separated.

Beginning with the season 1894–95, clubs finishing level on points were separated according to goal average (goals scored divided by goals conceded), or more properly put, goal ratio. In case one or more teams had the same goal difference, this system favoured those teams who had scored fewer goals. The goal average system was eventually scrapped beginning with the 1976–77 season.

From the 1922–23 season, the bottom two teams of both Third Division North and Third Division South were required to apply for re-election.

First Division

After the title disappointments of the previous five seasons, Manchester United finally ended their 41-year wait for the First Division title, finishing four points ahead of their nearest rivals, Tottenham Hotspur and Arsenal. 

Huddersfield Town and Fulham were relegated to the Second Division.

Results

Maps

Second Division

Results

Maps

Third Division North

Results

Maps

Third Division South

Results

Maps

See also
 1951-52 in English football

References

Ian Laschke: Rothmans Book of Football League Records 1888–89 to 1978–79. Macdonald and Jane’s, London & Sydney, 1980.

English Football League seasons
Eng
1951–52 in English football leagues